Jo-Ann Stores is an American specialty retailer of crafts and fabrics.

Jo-Ann or Jo Ann may also refer to:
Jo-Anne, given name, including variants such as Jo-Ann and Jo Ann
"Jo-Ann", song by the American 1950s vocal group The Playmates

See also
Jo-an, teahouse in Aichi Prefecture, Japan
Jo An (born 1982), South Korean actress
Joanne (disambiguation)